The 2005–06 Louisville Cardinals men's basketball team represented the University of Louisville in the 2005–06 NCAA Division I men's basketball season. The head coach was Rick Pitino and the team finished the season with an overall record of 21–13.

References 

Louisville Cardinals men's basketball seasons
Louisville
Louisville Cardinals men's basketball, 2005-06
Louisville Cardinals men's basketball, 2005-06